Who Drove the Grey Ford? is a 1950 West German crime film directed by Otto Wernicke and starring Wernicke, Ursula Herking and Hilde Sessak. Many scenes of the film were shot on location.

Synopsis
In the American Zone of Germany shortly after the Second World War, a gang of criminals make a living from hijacking trucks full of valuable goods. A local police detective investigates.

Cast
 Otto Wernicke as Kriminalkommissar Thieme
 Ruth Hambrock as Renate Münster
 Erich Scholz as Peteer 'Penny'
 Ursula Herking as Hertha Sattler, Kriminalassistentin
 Til Kiwe as Polizeirat Proske
 Hilde Sessak as Kellnerin bei Edu Schröder
 Marianne Gerzner as Rosl
 Günther Erich Marsch as Jonny Dempf
 Wolfgang Neuss as Uwe Lauterbach, 'Chef'
 Dieter Sommer as Franz Heiner
 Walter Vits-Mühlen as US-Kriminalkommissar Nelson
 Walter Pott as Edu Schröder, Wirt
 Abi von Hasse as Kriminalassistent Gillhausen
 Herbert Doberauer
 Georg Zimmermann as Hamerski, Oberpostschaffner

References

Bibliography
 Davidson, John & Hake, Sabine. Framing the Fifties: Cinema in a Divided Germany. Berghahn Books, 2007.

External links 
 

1950 films
1950 crime films
German crime films
West German films
1950s German-language films
German black-and-white films
1950s German films